Mora is a Spanish surname.

Origins 
Mora is a surname with old Roman (Latin) origins that originated in Spain and Portugal, but Mora was first found in Castile, one of medieval Spain's most important Christian kingdoms.

Mora translates to "blackberry", which is an edible fruit. In ancient times, this was an industrial surname for someone who grew and farmed these berries.

Additionally, surname "mora" derives from the habitual people who once "lived at one of the many places on the Iberian Peninsula [during the 16th century] called 'Mora'". Typically after people abandoned their original homes and relocated to a new place, they were granted habitational surnames explaining why there are many different surnames.

Popularity 
Mora had the highest family population In Missouri during the 1840s.  After that In the United States the number of people carrying the Mora last name grew 10,011 percent between 1880.

Mora is the 1,039th most frequent surname in the U. S., with an approximate 29,844 people with the name. Mora is also the 659th most frequent surname in France, with an estimated 7,193 people bearing the name.

Geographical Distribution 
This last name is most commonly used in Mexico, where it is carried by 183,731 people, or 1 in 676. ‘Mora’ is most numerous in: México, where 13%  reside in Jalisco, 13% reside in Michoacán. Overall, "Mora" Barring Mexico surnames exist in 156 countries. It also occurs in Colombia, where 15 percent reside and Costa Rica.

Notable people with the surname include:

Arts and literature
 Barry Mora (1940/41–2021), New Zealand operatic baritone
 Domingo Mora (d. 1911), Spanish born American sculptor and father of F. Luis Mora and Jo Mora
 F. Luis Mora (1874–1940), Hispanic American artist and illustrator
 Ferenc Móra (1879–1934), Hungarian writer
 Hermógenes L. Mora (born 1979), Nicaraguan poet
 Jo Mora (1876–1947), American artist
 José Mora (1642–1724), Spanish sculptor
 José Ferrater Mora (1912–1991), Catalan philosopher, essayist and writer
 Manuel Argüello Mora (1834–1902), Costa Rican writer
 Mirka Mora (1928–2018), French-born Australian visual artist
 Pat Mora (born 1942), American poet and writer
 Philippe Mora (born 1949), French-born Australian film director
 Rick Mora (born 1975), Native American actor
 Tiriel Mora (born 1958), Australian television and film actor
 Víctor Mora (comics) (1931–2016), pseudonym of Eugenio Roca, Spanish writer of comic books

Business and commerce
Evelyn Mora (born 1992), Finnish entrepreneur
 Georges Mora (1913–1992), German-born Australian entrepreneur, art dealer, patron, connoisseur and restaurateur

Law and politics
 Alberto J. Mora (born 1951), General Counsel of the United States Navy (2001–2006)
 Alejandra Mora Mora (born 1970), Costa Rican lawyer, professor, and politician
 Joaquín Mora Fernández (1786–1862), provisional head of state of Costa Rica in 1837
 José María Luis Mora (1794–1850), Mexican priest, lawyer, historian, politician, and progressive (liberal) ideologue
 Juan Mora Fernández (1784–1854), Costa Rica's first elected head of state, brother of Joaquín Mora Fernández
 Juan Rafael Mora Porras (1814–1860), President of Costa Rica (1849–1859)
 Miguel Mora Porras (1816–1887), President of Costa Rica in 1849
 Patricia Mora Castellanos (born 1951), Costa Rican academic and politician

Sports

American football
 Jim E. Mora (born 1935), former National Football League (NFL) and United States Football League head coach
 Jim L. Mora (born 1961), former NFL and college head coach, son of Jim E. Mora

Baseball
 Jesús Mora (baseball) (born 1933), Venezuelan ballplayer
 Melvin Mora (born 1972), Venezuelan professional baseball player

Cycling
 Naima Mora (born 1984), Americas Next Top Model Cycle 4 winner
 Néstor Mora (1963–1995), Colombian cyclist

Football
 Bruno Mora (1937–1986), Italian football player and coach
 Cristian Mora (born 1979), Ecuadorian football goalkeeper
 Iris Mora (born 1981), Mexican Olympic footballer
 José Francisco Mora (born 1981), Spanish footballer
 Juan Luis Mora (born 1973), Spanish retired football goalkeeper
 Octavio Mora (born 1965), Mexican former footballer	
 Sergio Mora Sánchez (born 1979), Spanish footballer
Sergio Mora, Costa Rican-American footballer

Other 
 Alfonso Mora (born 1964), Venezuelan former tennis player
 Sergio Mora (born 1980), Mexican-American boxer and former World Boxing Council light middleweight champion
 Víctor Mora (runner) (born 1944), Colombian long-distance runner

Other
 Jim Mora (broadcaster), New Zealand television and radio presenter
 Marie T. Mora, American economist

See also 
 De la Mora (disambiguation)

References

Catalan-language surnames
Spanish-language surnames